Barry James Hagan (August 2, 1957 – September 26, 1993) was an American figure skater.  Competing in ice dance with partner Kim Krohn, he won the bronze medal at the U.S. Figure Skating Championships in 1981.

Away from the ice, Hagan was struck by a car and knocked through a place glass door while working as a department store security guard in July 1981.  The driver of the car was an angry store customer.

Hagan died of AIDS in 1993 at age 36.

References

American male ice dancers
1957 births
1993 deaths
AIDS-related deaths in the United States